Lauren Arnouts (born 9 November 1994) is a Dutch former professional racing cyclist.

See also
 List of 2016 UCI Women's Teams and riders

References

External links
 

1994 births
Living people
Dutch female cyclists
Place of birth missing (living people)
20th-century Dutch women
20th-century Dutch people
21st-century Dutch women